Richard Whitehead Young (April 19, 1858 – December 27, 1919) was a U.S. Army brigadier general and an associate justice of the Supreme Court of the Philippines during the time that the Philippines was a U.S. Territory.

Young was born in Salt Lake City in 1858, to Joseph A. Young and his second (plural) wife, Margaret Whitehead. Joseph Young was the son of Brigham Young and his wife, Mary Ann Angell.

Young was raised for the first few years of his life in Salt Lake City: in the Beehive House, the adjoining Lion House, and in a house his parents owned on what is now the site of the Joseph Smith Memorial Building. As a teenager he studied at the University of Deseret. He was then a teacher and principal in Manti, Utah and worked for the office of the architect of the Church of Jesus Christ of Latter-day Saints (LDS Church). As a youth, Young was very good friends with Heber J. Grant who praised him as the most honest man he had ever known. 

For a time as a youth Young hoped to get his grandfather, Brigham Young, to fund his study of architecture at a university in the eastern United States. As a member of the LDS Church, he hoped in this way to be instrumental in building many of the church's temples.

He entered West Point in 1878, and graduated 15th in the Class of 1882 and was commissioned in the field artillery. He then briefly returned to Utah where his marriage to Minerva Richards was performed by Joseph F. Smith. They then went to New York City where Young was stationed at Fort Columbus on Governor's Island.

In 1884, Young graduated from Columbia Law School, and practiced as a military attorney until 1888, when he returned to Salt Lake City to open a private law practice. He officially resigned from the army the following year.

Young briefly served as a brigadier general in the national guard from 1895 to 1896, and reentered the Army during the Spanish–American War, leading the Utah Light Artillery Battalion in the Philippines. When the war ended, he was appointed as an associate justice of the U.S. Territory of the Philippines Supreme Court. He returned to private legal practice in 1901, acting as attorney for the Idaho Sugar Company (later becoming the Utah-Idaho Sugar Company).

In 1917, Young was commissioned as colonel and commanded the 145th Field Artillery Regiment. He was promoted to brigadier general in 1918, and commanded the 65th Field Artillery Brigade in France. He died of appendicitis in 1919, and was buried at Salt Lake City Cemetery.

Young married Minerva Richards, the daughter of Henry Phinehas Richards and Margaret Minerva Amanda Empey. Henry Richards was a son of Phinehas Richards and his wife, Wealthy Dewey, and thus a brother of Franklin D. Richards. Richard and Minerva were third cousins, since they both descended from Phineas Howe and Susannah Goddard.

Young's daughter Minerva was the wife of Adam S. Bennion.

See also

References

External links
 Richard W. Young info at Utah History To Go

1858 births
1919 deaths
History of the Philippines (1898–1946)
American expatriates in the Philippines
American Latter Day Saints
Columbia Law School alumni
American lawyers
American military personnel of the Philippine–American War
United States Army generals of World War I
United States Army generals
United States Military Academy alumni
Richards–Young family
Military personnel from Salt Lake City
Deaths from appendicitis
Burials at Salt Lake City Cemetery